The Faculty of Science is a constituent body of the University of Sydney, Australia. It was established in 1882.

In 2019 the faculty had a total student enrolment of 13,468 (21.2% of all students), thus making it the university's largest faculties and schools.

At the undergraduate level, the faculty offers the degrees of Bachelor of Science (also in two additional streams: Advanced; Advanced Mathematics), Bachelor of Liberal Arts and Sciences, Bachelor of Psychology, and Bachelor of Medical Science.

As of 2018, the Dean of the faculty is Professor Iain Young.

History
Teaching of science at the university began in 1852 (university was established in 1850), however the first professors were based within the Faculty of Arts. The Faculty of Science itself was established in 1882.

The first professor of mathematics and natural philosophy was Morris Pell, who was appointed in 1852.

Organisation

The faculty is divided into 8 schools.

Schools 
 School of Chemistry
 School of Geosciences
 School of History and Philosophy of Science
 School of Life and Environmental Sciences
 School of Mathematics and Statistics
 School of Physics
 School of Psychology
 School of Veterinary Science

Institutes
 The University of Sydney Institute of Agriculture, previously known as the Faculty of Agriculture and Environment.
 The University of Sydney Nano Institute (Sydney Nano), previously known as the Australian Institute for Nanoscale Science and Technology (AINST).

References

External links
 University of Sydney Faculty of Science

Educational institutions established in 1882
Science, Faculty of
1882 establishments in Australia